This is a list of the world's countries measuring the income of the richest one percent each (before taxes and transfers). The source of the data is the United Nations Development Programme, and refers to the latest available date. Countries unlisted have no data available.

See also 
 List of countries by income equality
 List of countries by inequality-adjusted HDI

References 

Global inequality
Income distribution
Inequality
Income